Slovenia competed at the 2013 Mediterranean Games in Mersin, Turkey held from 20–30 June 2013. They were  represented by 145 athletes in 18 sports.

Medalists

Archery 

Men

Women

Athletics 

Men
Track & road events

Field events

Women
Track & road events

Field events

Badminton

Bocce 

Lyonnaise

Boxing 

Men

Canoeing 

Legend: FA = Qualify to final (medal); FB = Qualify to final B (non-medal)

Gymnastics

Artistic 

Men

Women
Team

Rhythmic

Handball

Men's tournament

Team
Urban Lesjak
Matevž Skok
Matej Gaber
Uroš Bundalo
Vid Poteko
Simon Razgor
Niko Medved
Sebastian Skube
Borut Mačkovšek
Mario Šoštarič
Gašper Marguč
Jure Dolenec
Miha Svetelšek
Mitja Nosan
Jernej Papež
Dean Bombač

Women's tournament
Team

Judo 

Men

Women

Karate 

Men

Rowing 

Men

Women

Sailing 

Men

Women

Shooting 

Men

Women

Swimming 

Men

Women

Table tennis 

Women

Taekwondo

Tennis 

Men

Women

Volleyball

Beach

Indoor

Women's tournament

Team

Mojca Božič
Monika Potokar
Sara Valenčič
Urška Igličar
Živa Recek
Sara Hutinski
Elena Kučej
Valentina Založnik
Iza Mlakar
Meta Jerala
Saša Planinšec
Angelina Ajnihar

Standings

Results

Wrestling 

Men's Greco-Roman

References

Nations at the 2013 Mediterranean Games
2013
Mediterranean Games